Alexis Frank Jules Scholl (born 11 March 1996) is a Belgium professional footballer who plays for FC Ganshoren as a left back.

Club career
A product of Anderlecht's youth system, Scholl debuted professionally in Portugal for Benfica's reserve team on 12 September 2015 in a home win against Académico de Viseu (2–0) in the Segunda Liga. On 1 February 2016, he was loaned to K.A.A. Gent until the end of the season.

After two years without club, Scholl joined Belgian club FC Ganshoren in summer 2019.

References

External links
 
 
 

1996 births
Living people
Association football defenders
Belgian footballers
Belgium youth international footballers
R.S.C. Anderlecht players
S.L. Benfica B players
Liga Portugal 2 players
K.A.A. Gent players
Belgian expatriate footballers
Expatriate footballers in Portugal
Belgian expatriate sportspeople in Portugal